SMATSA or the Serbia and Montenegro Air Traffic Services Agency, is a Serbian air traffic control service company based in Belgrade, Serbia. It covers the air traffic in Serbia, Montenegro and about 55% of Bosnia and Herzegovina, until 5 December 2019 when air traffic control is transferred to Bosnia and Herzegovina Air Navigation Services Agency (BHANSA).

History

SMATSA was established on 31 October 2003. A new air traffic control facility was opened in 2010 near Belgrade Nikola Tesla Airport and covers about 9,000 m2, with an investment of around 1.08 billion Serbian dinars.

By these acts, the Flight Control of Serbia and Montenegro (SMATSA doo) continued to operate in accordance with national and international regulations, according to the international agreements signed until then.  It soon became a member of the world's most important international aviation organizations. This achieved the integration of SMATSA into the European air traffic management system as one of the members of EUROCONTROL.

References

External links
 

2003 establishments in Serbia
Aerospace companies of Serbia
Air navigation service providers
Aviation in Bosnia and Herzegovina
Aviation in Montenegro
Aviation in Serbia
Companies based in Belgrade
Transport companies established in 2003
D.o.o. companies in Serbia